Spectamen pardalis is a species of sea snail, a marine gastropod mollusk in the family Solariellidae.

Description
The size of the shell varies between 9 mm and 11 mm.

Distribution
This marine species occurs off KwaZuluNatal to Southwest Transkei, Rep. South Africa

References

External links
 To World Register of Marine Species
 
 Herbert D.G. (2015). An annotated catalogue and bibliography of the taxonomy, synonymy and distribution of the Recent Vetigastropoda of South Africa (Mollusca). Zootaxa. 4049(1): 1-98.

pardalis
Gastropods described in 1987